Giovanni d'Aragona may refer to:
Giovanni d'Aragona (cardinal) (1456–1485), Italian Roman Catholic cardinal
Giovanni Vincenzo Acquaviva d'Aragona (c. 1490–1546), Italian Roman Catholic cardinal